The year 1941 was marked by many events that left an imprint on the history of Soviet and Russian Fine Arts.

Events
 January 7 — The exhibition of the best works of Soviet artists was opened in Tretyakov gallery in Moscow. Exhibited 1180 works of painting, sculpture, graphic art, and architecture of 359 artists.
 February 4 — Exhibition of painting, sculpture, and graphic art, dedicated to 60th Anniversary of Klim Voroshilov was opened in Moscow. Exhibited 388 works of 219 artists.
 February 11 — The Second Exhibition of graduation works of High Art schools was opened in Moscow. Exhibited 205 works of 73 graduates of High Art schools.

Births
 March 24 — Eduard Drobitsky, Russian Soviet painter and graphic artist (d. 2007).

Deaths 
 March 15 — Alexej von Jawlensky, Russian artist (b. 1864).
 April 3 — Ivan Shadr, Russian Soviet sculptor (b. 1887).
 July 21 — Elizaveta Kruglikova, Russian Soviet graphic artist (b. 1865).
 December 3 — Pavel Filonov, Russian Soviet painter and graphic artist (b. 1883).

See also
 List of Russian artists
 List of painters of Leningrad Union of Artists
 Saint Petersburg Union of Artists
 Russian culture
 1941 in the Soviet Union

References

Sources
 Выставка лучших произведений советских художников. Путеводитель. М., Комитет по делам искусств при СНК СССР, 1941.
 Выставка живописи, графики и скульптуры. Советские художники к ко дню шестидесятилетия К. Ворошилова. М., Искусство, 1941.
 Молодые художники РСФСР. Каталог выставки. М., Управление по делам искусств при СНК РСФСР, 1941.
 7-я Выставка произведений ленинградских художников. Каталог. Л., ЛССХ, 1941.
 2-я Выставка дипломных работ художественных вузов. 1940. М., Комитет по делам искусств при СНК СССР, 1941.
 Художник-гравер Леонид Фёдорович Овсянников. Авт. вступит. статьи П. Е. Корнилов. Л., 1941.
 Выставки советского изобразительного искусства. Справочник. Т. 3. 1941—1947 годы. М., Советский художник, 1973.
 Artists of Peoples of the USSR. Biobibliography Dictionary. Vol. 1. Moscow, Iskusstvo, 1970.
 Artists of Peoples of the USSR. Biobibliography Dictionary. Vol. 2. Moscow, Iskusstvo, 1972.
 Directory of Members of Union of Artists of USSR. Volume 1,2. Moscow, Soviet Artist Edition, 1979.
 Directory of Members of the Leningrad branch of the Union of Artists of Russian Federation. Leningrad, Khudozhnik RSFSR, 1980.
 Artists of Peoples of the USSR. Biobibliography Dictionary. Vol. 4 Book 1. Moscow, Iskusstvo, 1983.
 Directory of Members of the Leningrad branch of the Union of Artists of Russian Federation. Leningrad, Khudozhnik RSFSR, 1987.
 Персональные и групповые выставки советских художников. 1917-1947 гг. М., Советский художник, 1989.
 Artists of peoples of the USSR. Biobibliography Dictionary. Vol. 4 Book 2. Saint Petersburg: Academic project humanitarian agency, 1995.
 Link of Times: 1932 – 1997. Artists – Members of Saint Petersburg Union of Artists of Russia. Exhibition catalogue. Saint Petersburg, Manezh Central Exhibition Hall, 1997.
 Matthew C. Bown. Dictionary of 20th Century Russian and Soviet Painters 1900-1980s. London, Izomar, 1998.
 Vern G. Swanson. Soviet Impressionism. – Woodbridge, England: Antique Collectors' Club, 2001.
 Время перемен. Искусство 1960—1985 в Советском Союзе. СПб., Государственный Русский музей, 2006.
 Sergei V. Ivanov. Unknown Socialist Realism. The Leningrad School. Saint-Petersburg, NP-Print Edition, 2007. , .
 Anniversary Directory graduates of Saint Petersburg State Academic Institute of Painting, Sculpture, and Architecture named after Ilya Repin, Russian Academy of Arts. 1915 – 2005. Saint Petersburg, Pervotsvet Publishing House, 2007.

Art
Soviet Union